Polycarp Pengo (born 5 August 1944) is a prelate of the Catholic Church who was Archbishop of Dar-es-Salaam, Tanzania, from 1992 to 2019. A bishop since 1983, he was made a cardinal in 1998.

Biography
Polycarp Pengo was born on 5 August 1944. He was ordained a priest in 1971, he studied Moral Theology in Rome at the Pontifical Lateran University, obtaining a doctorate in 1977. He taught Moral theology in Kipalapala Theological Seminary for a short time, and then became the first Rector of Segerea Theological Seminary in Dar-es-Salaam up to 1983.

He was made Bishop of Nachingwea (now Lindi) in 1983, and of Tunduru-Masasi in 1985.

In 1990 he was named Coadjutor Archbishop of Dar es Salaam, and in 1992 he became Archbishop of Dar-es-Salaam, following the resignation of Cardinal Laurean Rugambwa.

Pengo was proclaimed a cardinal by Pope John Paul II in the consistory of 21 February 1998. Pengo was one of the cardinal electors who participated in the 2005 papal conclave that elected Pope Benedict XVI and in the 2013 papal conclave that elected Pope Francis.

He has the following Curial Memberships Evangelization of the Peoples, Doctrine of Faith (congregations).
Interreligious Dialogue, Culture (councils)
Special Council for Africa of the General of the Synod of Bishops.

Since 2007 he has been president of the SECAM (Symposium of Episcopal Conferences of Africa and Madagascar).

On 18 September 2012, he was appointed by Pope Benedict XVI as a Synod Father for the upcoming October 2012 13th Ordinary General Assembly of the Synod of Bishops.

Pope Francis accepted his retirement as archbishop on 15 August 2019.

Views

Homosexuality
In 2000, Pengo hit out at the commission of homosexual acts, saying it was one of the most heinous sins on earth.

Clashes in Tanzania
In 2004, he lashed out at the perpetrators of clashes claiming to pursue a religious cause.

Church teaching on AIDS

Pengo has declared that the AIDS epidemic cannot be overcome by relying exclusively or primarily on the distribution of prophylactics, but only through a strategy based on education to individual responsibility in the framework of a moral view of human sexuality.

References

External links

 
 Cardinal Pengo's catholic-pages bio

 

1944 births
Living people
Pontifical Lateran University alumni
Tanzanian cardinals
Tanzanian Roman Catholic archbishops
20th-century Roman Catholic archbishops in Africa
21st-century Roman Catholic archbishops in Africa
Cardinals created by Pope John Paul II
20th-century cardinals
Roman Catholic archbishops of Dar-es-Salaam
Roman Catholic bishops of Lindi
Roman Catholic bishops of Tunduru–Masasi